This is a list of the butterflies and moths of Wallis and Futuna, a French overseas collectivity in the South Pacific.

Butterflies

Lycaenidae

Polyommatinae 
Euchrysops cnejus samoa (Herrich-Schaeffer, 1869)
Euploea boisduvalii boisduvalii Lucas, 1853
Euploea lewinii eschscholtzii (C & R Felder, 1865)

Nymphalidae

Nymphalinae 
Danaus plexippus (Linnaeus, 1758)
Hypolimnas bolina (Linnaeus, 1758)
Junonia villida villida (Fabricius, 1787)

Moths

Agonoxenidae 
Agonoxena argaula Meyrick, 1921

Crambidae 
Lamprosema octasema Meyrick, 1886
Nacoleia octasema (Meyrick, 1886)
Spoladea recurvalis (Fabricius, 1775)

Erebidae 
Achaea janata (Linnaeus, 1758)

Gelechiidae 
Scrobipalpa heliopa Lower, 1900

Noctuidae 
Eudocima phalonia (Linnaeus, 1763)
Helicoverpa armigera (Hübner, [1809])
Spodoptera litura (Fabricius, 1775)

Tortricidae 
Cryptophlebia pallifimbriana Bradley, 1953

Sphingidae 
Hippotion celerio (Linnaeus, 1758)

References 
W.John Tennent: A checklist of the butterflies of Melanesia, Micronesia, Polynesia and some adjacent areas. Zootaxa 1178: 1-209 (21 April 2006)
Gutierrez, 1981. Actualisation des Données sur l'Entomologie Economique à Wallis et a Futuna. ORSTOM.

Fauna of Wallis and Futuna
Wallis
Wallis
Wallis and Futuna
Wallis and Futuna
Wallis and Futuna
Butter